He's My Guy is a 1943 American comedy film directed by Edward F. Cline and written by M. Coates Webster and Grant Garett. The film stars Dick Foran, Irene Hervey, Joan Davis, Fuzzy Knight, Don Douglas and Samuel S. Hinds. The film was released on March 26, 1943, by Universal Pictures.

The ballad and jazz standard written by Don Raye and Gene de Paul with the same title as this film was introduced by Foran and Davis.

Plot

Cast        
Dick Foran as Van Moore
Irene Hervey as Terry Allen
Joan Davis as Madge Donovan
Fuzzy Knight as Sparks
Don Douglas as Kirk 
Samuel S. Hinds as Johnson
William Halligan as Elwood 
Gertrude Niesen as herself
The Diamond Brothers as Themselves
Louis DaPron as himself
The Mills Brothers as Themselves
Lorraine Krueger as herself
The Dorene Sisters as Themselves

References

External links
 

1943 films
American comedy films
1943 comedy films
Universal Pictures films
Films directed by Edward F. Cline
American black-and-white films
1940s English-language films
1940s American films